"Genick" is a song recorded by Swiss-Albanian rapper Loredana released as the fifth single from her debut studio album, King Lori (2019). The song was written by the aforementioned rapper, and composed and produced by German producers Macloud and Miksu.

Commercially, "Genick" experienced great success in Austria, Germany and Switzerland reaching number three in all three countries, respectively. It additionally peaked at number fifty eight in her native Albania.

Background

Composition 

"Genick" was entirely written by Loredana herself while both, the composition and production, was handled by German producers Macloud and Miksu. Lasting three minutes and twenty five seconds, it is performed in the key of A minor in common time with a moderate tempo of 105 beats per minute. Characterised as a trap ballad, its lyrical themes make reference to a past romantic relationship and the new beginnings developing out of the relationship. Critics noted the theme to be a response to the personal case between Loredana and her former husband, Mozzik.

Music video 

Met with mixed reviews from music critics, an accompanying music video for "Genick" was uploaded to Loredana's official YouTube channel on 12 September 2019, where it has since amassed a total of 40 million views. As the video progresses, Loredana repeatedly targets a helpless man with a gun and even kills him before the end of the video.

Charts

Certifications

References 

2010s ballads
2019 singles
2019 songs
Loredana Zefi songs
German-language songs
German-language Albanian songs
Song recordings produced by Macloud
Song recordings produced by Miksu
Songs written by Loredana Zefi